Amy Victoria Monkhouse (born 6 May 2001) is a British racing cyclist, who currently rides for Dutch amateur team Watersley Race & Development Team.

References

External links

2001 births
Living people
British female cyclists
Place of birth missing (living people)
21st-century British women